Mauro Alanís (born 15 January 1934) is a Mexican weightlifter. He competed at the 1960 Summer Olympics, the 1964 Summer Olympics and the 1968 Summer Olympics.

References

1934 births
Living people
Mexican male weightlifters
Olympic weightlifters of Mexico
Weightlifters at the 1960 Summer Olympics
Weightlifters at the 1964 Summer Olympics
Weightlifters at the 1968 Summer Olympics
Sportspeople from Mexico City
Pan American Games medalists in weightlifting
Pan American Games bronze medalists for Mexico
Weightlifters at the 1959 Pan American Games
20th-century Mexican people
21st-century Mexican people